Český slavík is a Czech award meant to recognize outstanding achievement and annual popularity in the Czech music industry. It was established in 1996 as the successor to the Zlatý slavík awards, which was established in 1962 in Czechoslovakia by magazine Mladý svět and Smena na nedeľu, which continued until 1991.  "The 16th Cesky Slavik" was held on 25 November 2011 at the State Opera, in Prague, Czech Republic.

From 1999 to 2017, the award has been sponsored by the mineral water producer Mattoni and hence officially known as Český slavík Mattoni, or Mattoni's Czech Nightingale.

Current award categories are "Male Singer", "Female Singer", "Musical Group", "Absolute Nightingale", and "Hip Hop & Rap".

Winners

Leaders
With twenty-one Český slavík awards Lucie Bílá is the most successful artist in the history of the award to date. She is followed by Karel Gott with twenty awards, the band Kabát, which has earned thirteen awards, and the groups No Name and Lucie.

See also
 Zlatý slavík
 Slávik Awards

References

Czech culture
Czech music awards
Awards established in 1996
1996 establishments in the Czech Republic
Zlatý slavík